Structurally Sound is an album by American jazz saxophonist Booker Ervin recorded in 1966 and released on the Pacific Jazz label. The album was rereleased on CD in 2001 on the Blue Note label with four bonus tracks.

Reception
The Allmusic review by Matt Collar awarded the album 3½ stars and stated: "Structurally Sound is perhaps not Ervin's most provocative album, but a solid and tasty endeavor".

Track listing
 "Berkshire Blues" (Randy Weston) - 5:30 
 "Dancing in the Dark" (Howard Dietz, Arthur Schwartz) - 4:58 
 "Stolen Moments" (Oliver Nelson) - 4:59 
 "Franess" (Charles Tolliver) - 5:08 
 "Boo's Blues" (Booker Ervin) - 5:33 
 "You're My Everything" (Harry Warren, Mort Dixon, Joe Young) - 4:46 
 "Deep Night" (Charles Henderson, Rudy Vallee) - 4:58 
 "Take the "A" Train" (Billy Strayhorn) - 3:43 
 "Shiny Stockings" (Frank Foster) - 4:48 Bonus track on CD reissue 
 "White Christmas" (Irving Berlin) - 4:27 Bonus track on CD reissue 
 "Franess" [alternate take] (Tolliver) - 5:13 Bonus track on CD reissue 
 "Deep Night" [alternate take] (Henderson, Vallee) - 7:15 Bonus track on CD reissue
Recorded at Pacific Jazz Studios in Los Angeles, California on December 14 (tracks 5, 6 & 9), December 15 (tracks 1, 4, 8 & 11), December 16 (tracks 2, 3, 7, 10 & 12), 1966.

Personnel
Booker Ervin - tenor saxophone
Charles Tolliver - trumpet
John Hicks - piano
Red Mitchell - bass
Lenny McBrowne - drums

References 

Pacific Jazz Records albums
Booker Ervin albums
1967 albums